Judolia gaurotoides is a species of beetle in the family Cerambycidae. It was described by Casey in 1893.

References

G
Beetles described in 1893